William Nyogen Yeo is spiritual director of Hazy Moon Zen Center in Los Angeles, California, one of the twelve Dharma Successors of the late Taizan Maezumi. He is a member of the American Zen Teachers Association.

See also
Timeline of Zen Buddhism in the United States

References

Rinzai Buddhists
Soto Zen Buddhists
Zen Buddhist spiritual teachers
American Zen Buddhists
Living people
Year of birth missing (living people)